Pediatric Obesity, formerly known as International Journal of Pediatric Obesity is a peer-reviewed medical journal covering research into all aspects of obesity during childhood and adolescence. The editor-in-chief is Michael Goran (Keck School of Medicine, University of Southern California). The journal is one of three journals published by Wiley-Blackwell on behalf of the International Association for the Study of Obesity.

References

External links 

International Association for the Study of Obesity

English-language journals
Publications established in 2005
Bimonthly journals
Wiley-Blackwell academic journals
Pediatrics journals
Obesity journals
Nutrition and dietetics journals